The eastern rat (Rattus mordax) is a species of rodent in the family Muridae.

It is found only in Papua New Guinea.

References

Rattus
Rodents of New Guinea
Rodents of Papua New Guinea
Mammals described in 1904
Taxa named by Oldfield Thomas
Taxonomy articles created by Polbot